Jerry Best may refer to:
 Jerry Best (bassist) (born 1963), American hard rock bassist, songwriter and composer
 Jerry Best (footballer, born 1897) (1897–1955), English football goalkeeper
 Jerry Best (footballer, born 1901) (1901–1975), English football forward